Råslätt Church is a church building at Råslätt in Jönköping in Sweden. Belonging to the Kristina-Ljungarum of the Church of Sweden, it is dated back to the 1970s, and the architect was Per Rudenstam.

References

20th-century Church of Sweden church buildings
Churches in Jönköping
Churches in the Diocese of Växjö